Choy Yee Bridge is an at-grade MTR Light Rail stop located at the junction of Shek Pai Tau Road and Choy Yee Bridge in Tuen Mun District. Named after the nearby Choy Yee Bridge, the stop began service on 18 September 1988 and belongs to Zone 2. It serves nearby Chelsea Heights Phase II.

MTR Light Rail stops
Former Kowloon–Canton Railway stations
Tuen Mun District
Railway stations in Hong Kong opened in 1988